Doc the Destroyer is a 1987 role-playing video game for the Commodore 64 and ZX Spectrum. It was published in the United Kingdom by Melbourne House. The game offers keyboard or joystick input for multiple choice adventure.

Plot 

The story follows Doc, a time traveller. As Doc is searching for adventure by traveling to different time periods, he stops in Domed City. Doc thinks he'll find some adventure here, but somehow loses his time machine and can't escape from this era. You make decisions for Doc as you help find his long lost machine.

Gameplay

Development

Reception

References

External links 

 
 
 

Commodore 64 games
ZX Spectrum games
Role-playing video games
1987 video games
Video games developed in Australia